Bao Jianfeng (born November 3, 1975) is a Chinese actor and singer of Mongolian descent, best known in film for portraying Mao Zedong in The Road of Exploring (2011), Lü Bu in The Assassins (2012) and Chen Shuxiang in The Bloody of Xiangjiang River, and has received critical acclaim for his television work, particularly as Gu Yuetao in The Shining Teenagers (2002), Gaozong of Tang in Lady Wu: The First Empress (2004), Wei Zheng in The Prince of Qin, Li Shimin (2005), Xue Rengui in The Legend of Xue Rengui (2006), Chu Lian in Dreams Link, and King Zhou of Shang in Zhaoge.

Biography

Early life
Bao Jianfeng was born into a military family on November 3, 1975. He attended the East China Model High School. After completing his education in Shanghai Theatre Academy, he was assigned to Shanghai Dramatic Arts Center.

Acting career
Bao Jianfeng's first screen acting credit was Zhenkong Aiqing Jilu and subsequently appearing on television series such as Pearl Tower (1998), The 28 Nannies of Professor Tian's Family (1998), Love and Resentment of Two Generations (2000), and Purple File (2001).

Bao Jianfeng's first film role was uncredited appearance in the film A Beautiful New World (1999), a comedy film starring Jiang Wu, Tao Hong, Richie Jen, and Wu Bai.

In 2002, Bao Jianfeng co-starred with Ni Jingyang, Kym and Li Zhinan in the idol drama The Shining Teenagers as Gu Yuetao, the class teacher and Chinese teacher. That same year, he had key supporting role as Liu Bei, a warlord in the late Eastern Han dynasty and the founder of the state of Shu Han in the Three Kingdoms period, in Chen Kaige's Lü Bu and Diao Chan.

In 2003, Bao Jianfeng starred as Emperor Gaozong of Tang, reuniting him with co-star Jia Jingwen, who played Wu Zetian, in the historical romantic television series Lady Wu: The First Empress. It was a hot TV series in mainland China in that year.

In 2004, Bao Jianfeng starred in a historical television series called The Prince of Qin, Li Shimin with Peter Ho, Gao Yuanyuan, Kevin Yan, and Jia Jingwen. At the same year, he also played the Kangxi Emperor, the lead role in Huayi Brothers's Qingtian Yamen, costarring Zhong Fuxiang and Xu Yun.

In 2005, Bao Jianfeng starred as Xue Rengui in The Legend of Xue Rengui, alongside Jin Qiaoqiao, Ashton Chen, Li Xiaoran, and Zhang Tielin. He also played the character Yang Yande in Warriors of the Yang Clan, opposite Ti Lung and Angie Chiu.

In 2006, Bao Jianfeng appeared in Super Boy and Girl, a romantic television series starring Hu Bing, Ady An, Victor Huang, and Fu Miao.

In 2007, Bao Jianfeng was cast in the film Detection of Knight-errant： the Scholar's Death, opposite Gu Zhixin, Cherrie Ying and Fu Heng. That same year, he starred opposite Alex Fong, Zhang Jiani, and Qin Lan in Dreams Link, adapted from Taiwanese novelist Chiung Yao's romantic novel Fantasies Behind the Pearly Curtain.

In 2008, Bao Jianfeng was cast in Nühai Chongchongchong, a comedy television series starring Jing Boran, Yang Zi, and Huang Shengyi.

In 2011, Bao Jianfeng co-starred with Zhou Dongyu, Qian Feng and Tao Shuai in the biographical film The Road of Exploring as Mao Zedong. He also made cameo appearances in Close To Me and The Founding Father Sun Yat-sen. He had a minor role in Romance of Tang′ Kongfu, which starred Alex Fong and Chrissie Chau.

In 2012, he guest starred in the historical drama film The Assassins. That same year, he starred in Good Wife, playing the husband of Liu Tao's character.

In 2013, he starred in the historical television series Hua Xu Yin: City of Desperate Love with Kevin Cheng, Lin Yuan, Yuan Hong, and Jiang Xin.

In 2014, Bao Jianfeng starred opposite Yang Gongru, Zhang Xiwen and Danny Lee in Country Wind and Rain. He co-starred with Liu Tao in Outsmarted His Huashan Legend.

In 2015, he starred with Yan Bingyan in We Will Make It Right. The film won the Best World Movie at the 20th Sedona Film Festival and the Best Small and Medium Cost Feature Film at the 30th Golden Rooster Awards. He had a cameo appearance in Money Game, a comedy film starring , Zhang Lanxin, Liu Hua, and Zhang Yishan. He also had a minor role as a wealthy merchant in the 3D fantasy action comedy adventure film Monster Hunt, which starred Bai Baihe, Jing Boran and Jiang Wu.

In 2016, it was announced that Bao Jianfeng joined Midnight Diner 2, opposite Yi Yi and Qiao Shan. He also portrayed one of the leads as King Zhou of Shang in Zhaoge.

In 2017, he had key supporting role in the war film Battle of Xiangjiang River, created by August First Film Studio. He portrayed Tan Pingshan in Andrew Lau's The Founding of an Army, a historical film released on July 28, 2017 to mark the 90th anniversary of the founding of the People’s Liberation Army.

Musical career
On April 2, 2008, Bao Jianfeng released his debut album, Heartbreaker.

Personal life
On April 25, 2009, Bao Jianfeng married He Jiahao in Shanghai. Their son was born on June 25, 2015.

Filmography

Film

Television series

Variety show

Discography

Studio album

Singles
 Flower Season of Sunflower Flower
 We are Much Happier Than the Flowers

Awards and nominations

References

1975 births
Male actors from Shanghai
Living people
Shanghai Theatre Academy alumni
Chinese male film actors
Chinese male television actors
Singers from Shanghai
21st-century Chinese male singers